Taiki Shuttle (March 23, 1994 – August 17, 2022) was an American-bred, Japanese-trained thoroughbred race horse and stallion. He won races at the highest level both home and abroad, most notably winning the Mile Championship (twice), Yasuda Kinen, and Sprinters Stakes in Japan and the Prix Jacques Le Marois in France. Taiki Shuttle was honored as the Japanese Racing Association's (JRA) Champion Sprinter in both 1997 and 1998, and was named the Japan Horse of the Year in 1998, along with Champion Older Male Horse.

In 1999, he was inducted into the JRA Hall of Fame.

Taiki Shuttle died on August 17, 2022. He suffered a heart attack while he was sleeping due to his advanced age.

Background
Foaled in the United States, Taiki Shuttle is a flaxen chestnut horse with a large white star, bred and owned by Taiki Farm. Taiki Shuttle is a son of Devil's Bag, the 1983 American Champion Two-Year-Old Male Horse. His dam, Welsh Muffin, a daughter of Caerleon, was a stakes winner in Ireland.

During his racing career he was trained by Kazuo Fujisawa.

Racing career

1996 and 1997 
Taiki Shuttle was originally slated to enter Fujisawa Stable's Miura training center in the fall of his juvenile year, but the schedule was delayed due to leg injury and hoof suppuration. He entered Fujisawa stable on February 5, 1997. Even after he entered the area, he was troubled by moyamoya disease in his legs, and the condition deteriorated with training, so his debut was again delayed.

His connections' patience paid off as Taiki Shuttle broke his maiden at first asking in a maiden race at Tokyo Racecourse on April 19, 1997 going 1600 meters on dirt, and won his next two races, including the Shobu Stakes on turf. He tasted defeat in his fourth start when running second to Tenzan Storm in the Bodaiju Stakes at Hanshin Racecourse. Taiki Shuttle won his first graded stakes next in the Group 3 Unicorn Stakes. He would not be defeated again until his final race.

He then won the Group 2 Swan Stakes as a prep race for the Mile Championship, a prestigious mile race in Japan, which he won. He then won the Sprinters Stakes to close out the year. He was named Best Sprinter or Miler of 1997 by the Japanese Racing Association.

1998 
Taiki Shuttle opened 1998 with a win in the Group 3 Keio Hai Spring Cup in May. The next month he won the Group 1 Yasuda Kinen. After the Yasuda Kinen, Taiki Shuttle shipped out to France to run in the Group 1 Prix Jacques Le Marois. He won the race and then went on to win his second Mile Championship.

In his final career race, he tried to repeat in the Sprinters Stakes, finishing third behind Meiner Love.

Taiki Shuttle was named Horse of the Year, Best Sprinter or Miler, and Best Older Male of 1998 by the Japan Racing Association.

Honours
Taiki Shuttle was voted Japan's Champion Sprinter/ Miler in 1997 and 1998. In the latter year he has also named Japanese Champion Older Male Horse and Japanese Horse of the Year. He has been inducted into the Japan Racing Association Hall of Fame.

Retirement and stud career
Taiki Shuttle stood his stallion career at stud at Arrow Stud in Shinhidaka (former Shizunai), Japan. He periodically shuttled to East Stud in Hokkaido.

The two underwent successful castration in January 2019.

On September 15, 2019, the manes of Taiki Shuttle and Rose Kingdom, a fellow JRA Champion, were mysteriously cut by an unknown person. It appeared that a sharp tool had been used to cut the hair, but the horses were otherwise unharmed. The farm filed a report with the Hokkaido Police and ceased visitation to the farm for security and investigative purposes. The suspect, 55 year old Kazuyo Tanaka from Kawaguchi, Saitama, was arrested the following year.

Taiki Shuttle, along with Meisho Doto, were moved from the Versailles Farm to the Northern Lake Farm on June 16, 2021. Taiki Shuttle would pass away at Northern Lake Farm the following year due to old age.

Taiki Shuttle's notable progeny include:

 Win Kluger (2000) winner of the NHK Mile Cup (Jpn-I) in 2003.
 Meisho Bowler (2001) winner of the February Stakes (JPN-GI) in 2005.
 Summer Wind (2005) winner of the JBC Sprint (Jpn-I) in 2010.

Pedigree 

Taiki Shuttle has a 3x5 inbreeding of Hail to Reason and a 5x5 inbreed of Mahmoud.

See also
 List of historical horses

References

1994 racehorse births
2022 racehorse deaths
Racehorses bred in Kentucky
Racehorses trained in Japan
Japanese Thoroughbred Horse of the Year
Thoroughbred family 4-d